The 1995 Royal Liver Assurance UK Championship was a professional ranking snooker tournament that took place at the Guild Hall in Preston, England. The event started on 17 November 1995 and the televised stages were shown on the BBC between 25 November and 3 December 1995.

Stephen Hendry won his fourth UK title by defeating Peter Ebdon 10–3. Hendry also made the first maximum break in the televised stage of the UK Championship, against Gary Wilkinson. Willie Thorne had made one in 1987, and Ebdon himself made one in the qualifying stage in 1992, but neither were televised. Hendry also cleared a 146 in the last frame of the final to win 10–3 against Ebdon.


Prize fund
The breakdown of prize money for this year is shown below: 
Winner: £60,000
Runner-up: £32,000
Semi-final: £16,000
Quarter-finalists: £9,050
Last 16: £4,550
Last 32: £2,600
Last 64: £1,900

Main draw

1st Round  Best of 17 frames

 Stephen Hendry   9–3  Jamie Burnett 

 Anthony Hamilton  9–3   Stuart Pettman 

 Terry Griffiths   9–3   Dylan Leary 

 Gary Wilkinson   9–4   Jason Prince 

 Ken Doherty   9–8   Drew Henry 

 Jason Ferguson   9–6   Karl Broughton 

 Darren Morgan   9–3   Dave Finbow 

 Dennis Taylor   9–2   Jimmy Michie 

 Tony Drago   9–1   Tony Jones 

 Mark Williams   9–6   Joe Swail 

 John Parrott   9–2   Jamie Woodman 

 Willie Thorne   9–6   Tony Meo 

 John Higgins   9–3   Mark King 

 Alain Robidoux   9–4   Karl Payne 

 Jimmy White   9–5   Matt Wilson 

 Stuart Reardon   9–6   Brian Morgan 

 Peter Ebdon   9–7   Barry Pinches 

 Matthew Stevens   9–4   Steve James 

 Stephen Lee   9–6   Steve Davis 

 Neal Foulds   9–5   Doug Mountjoy 

 Nigel Bond   9–3   Surinder Gill 

 Tony Knowles   9–7   Jon Birch 

 Paul Hunter   9–4   Alan McManus 

 Wayne Jones   9–5   Dean Reynolds 

 James Wattana   9–4   Darryn Walker 

 Dene O'Kane   9–4   Mark Johnston-Allen 

 Andy Hicks   9–5   Gerard Greene 

 Mark Bennett   9–7   Dave Harold 

 Mark Flowerdew   9–4   Martin Clark 

 Chris Small   9–7   David Roe 

 Ronnie O'Sullivan   9–3  Steve Meakin 

 Paul Davies   9–6   Mick Price 

2nd Round  Best of 17 frames

 Stephen Hendry   9–3   Anthony Hamilton 

 Gary Wilkinson   9–3   Terry Griffiths 

 Ken Doherty   9–4   Jason Ferguson 

 Dennis Taylor   9–8   Darren Morgan 

 Mark Williams   9–7   Tony Drago 

 John Parrott   9–3   Willie Thorne 

 John Higgins   9–1   Alain Robidoux 

 Jimmy White   9–4   Stuart Reardon 

 Peter Ebdon   9–6   Matthew Stevens 

 Stephen Lee   9–7   Neal Foulds 

 Nigel Bond   9–4   Tony Knowles 

 Wayne Jones   9–6   Paul Hunter 

 James Wattana   9–6   Dene O'Kane 

 Andy Hicks   9–7   Mark Bennett 

 Chris Small   9–2   Mark Flowerdew 

 Ronnie O'Sullivan   9–4   Paul Davies

Final

Century breaks
Breaks shown in bold were made on the television stages.

 147, 146, 133, 130, 128, 118, 105, 104, 100  Stephen Hendry
 144, 106  Tony Drago
 143, 109, 106  Matthew Stevens
 143  Darren Guest
 137, 126, 102, 100  Andy Hicks
 135, 108  Ronnie O'Sullivan
 135  John Parrott
 133  Barry Pinches
 129, 108  Anthony Hamilton
 127  Alan McManus
 126, 123, 108, 101  John Higgins
 126, 100  Stuart Pettman
 125, 112  Paul Hunter
 125  James Wattana
 122  Darren Morgan
 121  Neal Foulds
 118  Mick Price
 115  Jimmy White
 113  Ken Doherty
 112, 105  Nick Pearce
 111  Mark Flowerdew
 107, 103  Peter Ebdon
 106, 101  Chris Small
 105  Steve James
 104, 103  Drew Henry
 104  Tai Pichit
 102  Brian Morgan
 101  Martin Clark

References

1995
UK Championship
UK Championship
UK Championship
UK Championship